"Get Lucky" is a song written and performed by French electronic music duo Daft Punk featuring American musicians Pharrell Williams and Nile Rodgers. Daft Punk released the song as the lead single from their fourth and final studio album, Random Access Memories, on 19 April 2013. Before its release as a single, "Get Lucky" was featured in television advertisements broadcast during Saturday Night Live, after which Rodgers and Williams announced their involvement in the track. "Get Lucky" is a house-inspired disco, funk, and pop track with lyrics that, according to Williams, are about the good fortune of connecting with someone, as well as sexual chemistry. "Get Lucky" has since received acclaim from critics, with a number of them praising Williams's vocals and Rodgers's guitar licks.

The song reached number one in several countries, including Daft Punk's native France, where the Syndicat National de l'Édition Phonographique (SNEP) certified it diamond. "Get Lucky" peaked at number two on the US Billboard Hot 100 for five consecutive weeks, giving Daft Punk their first top-10 hit in the United States. In the UK, the single topped the UK Singles Chart for four weeks and was the second best-selling single of 2013 with 1,308,007 copies sold. The song won multiple awards, including Record of the Year and Best Pop Duo/Group Performance at the 56th Annual Grammy Awards. Daft Punk performed it on many television programmes and awards shows, including the 56th Annual Grammy Awards, during which Stevie Wonder joined Rodgers, Williams and Daft Punk onstage to perform the song.

Background
Daft Punk first met American guitarist Nile Rodgers at a listening party in New York City for the duo's 1997 debut album Homework, and became friends thereafter. However, Rodgers noted that a series of near misses and scheduling conflicts had delayed their chance of collaborating. The duo eventually invited him to the Random Access Memories sessions at Electric Lady Studios in New York City.

American singer Pharrell Williams was interested in working with Daft Punk; he had first heard about the project from Daft Punk at one of Madonna's parties, and offered his services for a collaboration. He had joked that, "If you just want me to play tambourine, I'll do it." The duo and Williams later met in Paris, where he shared some of his own material; Williams explained that he had been inspired by Rodgers without knowing that Daft Punk had coincidentally been recording with him. As a member of The Neptunes production team, Williams had previously provided a remix of "Harder, Better, Faster, Stronger" that appeared on the 2003 album Daft Club. Daft Punk also served as co-writers and producers for the 2010 single "Hypnotize U" by N.E.R.D., Williams's band.

Production
"Get Lucky" was completed in approximately 18 months. Prior to Rodgers's involvement, the song existed in a rough form that centered on a Wurlitzer electronic piano. After listening to Daft Punk's demo of what would become "Get Lucky", Rodgers asked that all of the elements except the drum track be muted so that he could create a suitable guitar part; he recalled that he experimented until the duo were visibly pleased. Once Rodgers finished, Daft Punk had Nathan East re-record the bass part to fit Rodgers's performance. Rodgers further elaborated: "Everybody else wound up re-playing to me." Mixer and engineer Mick Guzauski recalled that the rhythm guitar fit easily into the production: "I experimented with balancing and other positioning, and working other stuff around it. He didn’t have to be processed – Nile just sounded great the way he is." The song as it appears on the album also features a synthesizer by Daft Punk, keyboards by Chris Caswell and additional guitar performed by Paul Jackson, Jr.

Williams noted that the duo adopted a perfectionist approach when recording the vocals for "Get Lucky", as he was asked to perform several takes and multiple instances of specific phrases. He also said that when he returned to the United States after recording his vocals, he had "forgotten everything" regarding the composition of "Get Lucky". He attributed it to jet lag, but jokingly wondered if Daft Punk had tampered with his memory. The duo responded, saying that Williams's lyrics and performance had arisen spontaneously, and was likely the reason he had trouble recalling the song.

Composition

Music critics described "Get Lucky" as a house-inspired disco, funk, and pop track. The song is composed in the key of F minor, in the B dorian mode and follows the chord progression of Bm–D–Fm–E. The song runs at common time with a tempo of 116 BPM.

In an article for Slate, Owen Pallett  states that the song can be heard in two different keys: "Most of the time it sounds as if it's in the minor mode of [F♯] Aeolian [...] essentially a form of [F♯] minor", which appears as the third chord of the progression on the line "We're up all night for good fun". The first chord of the progression is not F♯ minor, but B minor; the song "slides back to it each time" on the line "I'm up all night to get some". Pallett continues, "when the chord cycle comes back to the beginning [...] the ear is tricked for a moment into thinking that the song is in a different key, a musical Tilt-a-Whirl". According to Pallett, in the song's bridge, Daft Punk "overlay the hook from the pre-chorus with the hook from the chorus, getting them both going simultaneously".

British journalist Caitlin Moran speculates that the song's attractiveness is due to its combination of minor chords and regular disco-type "up" beats throughout the song, with the former creating an unresolved feeling. Jason Lipshutz of Billboard mentioned it "rides Nile Rodgers' chic axe work, an effectively simple hook and clipped robo-breakdown to create a warm, winning throwback". The staff of Rolling Stone said the song has a "bright guitar shimmer, robot come-ons, falsetto soul and a beat that keeps you up having good fun until you see the sun". Jake Cohen for Consequence wrote that the song has "choppy, half-spoken lyrics, leading into sustained vocal notes on the bridge 'We've come too far', ascending 'to the stars'. And then there's the easy-to-sing celebration of hedonistic good times of the chorus, and the vocodor-laden outro where the voices become another delicious layer in the instrumental gumbo." Williams remarked that the music evoked the sense of being on an exotic island during a "peachy color[ed]" sunrise.

Tim Jonze for The Guardian said the lyrics are an "ode to joyless sex, hard-won after a war of attrition". He also noted the lyrics "She's up all night 'til the sun/I'm up all night to get some/She's up all night for good fun/ I'm up all night to get lucky" are about "sexual politics". Pharrell mentioned that the title "Get Lucky" does not only refer to sexual acts, but also the good fortune of meeting with and immediately connecting to someone. Williams's vocal and Daft Punk's vocoder performance span three octaves together: D2 to D5. Friend and occasional collaborator Chilly Gonzales mentioned that Daft Punk had previously used the chord progression in "Around the World" and that the verse, bridge and chorus of "Get Lucky" are largely defined by the melodic phrasing of the vocal.

Promotion
"Get Lucky" was first publicly revealed via two 15-second television advertisements on Saturday Night Live. Rodgers announced his contribution to the song shortly afterward, and noted that various fan remixes of the clips appeared online since they aired. The third trailer, which was shown at the Coachella Valley Music and Arts Festival, officially announced Williams's involvement in the song and features Daft Punk, Rodgers, and Williams performing together. The promotional web series The Collaborators featured excerpts of "Get Lucky", culminating in the Williams-focused episode in which the song was first referred to by name. The song was leaked and broadcast on various radio stations days before it was released as a single. One day before the song's release, the single's cover artwork was revealed on Amazon, featuring a band playing in front of a setting sun.

Daft Punk released the song as the lead single from their fourth and final studio album, Random Access Memories, on 19 April 2013. A trailer for the official "Get Lucky" remix was released via the Columbia Records YouTube channel on 25 June 2013. Rodgers later stated that video footage for "Lose Yourself to Dance" had been shot simultaneously with footage for "Get Lucky". The Daft Punk remix was later released on Spotify and, as of 27 June 2013, was streamed 64 million times. Rodgers stated in an interview with The Guardian that a different video for the song was shot in March 2013, which is distinct from the Coachella trailer. A 12" vinyl single was released on 16 July 2013, featuring a ten-minute remix by Daft Punk, the album version and the radio edit.

Critical reception
Michael Cragg from The Guardian said the song "eschews the crunching electronics of their last album and the vocoder-lead future-disco of Discovery", and it was the "best thing Pharrell Williams has been involved with for a long time". Pitchfork listed "Get Lucky" as a Best New Track, stating that the song's "real elegance lies in the hands of Nile Rodgers"; one of its contributors, Mark Richardson, opined the song was a "deserved hit". Lewis Corner from Digital Spy gave the single five stars and said although Daft Punk's "creative methods may be unorthodox, the final result is a legal rush we can all enjoy". Thomas Smith of NME said the song is "impossibly good" and called it an "old-school jam session that's been spun into a super-sleek slice of pop magic".  Chris Mincher of The A.V. Club stated the song "has run up the charts with little more than a simple, breezy funk groove".

Steve Lampiris for The Line of Best Fit said "Get Lucky" is the "breeziest thing Daft Punk have ever made. The itchy slink of Nile Rodgers' guitar suggests a wonderful sunset that never ends". For AllMusic, Heather Phares praised the song as "so suave that it couldn't help but be an instant classic, albeit a somewhat nostalgic one". Slate Geeta Dayal described the track as a "breezy, infectious disco hit [that] seemed to be a good omen". Benji Taylor of Renowned for Sound mentioned the song is "driven by Nile Rodgers' irresistible funk fuelled guitar licks, and feature[s] vocals by Williams that would not have sounded out of place on Off the Wall or Thriller". Tatiana Cirisano of Billboard stated it has a "dreamy, retro-meets-futurism magic and a perfectly ambiguous message". Miles Raymer for the Chicago Reader opined it is a "quintessential summer jam, bouncy but not oppressively eager to get you to dance, with a Pharrell vocal hook that's basically impossible to get out of your head once it's in there and a guitar riff from the legendary Nile Rodgers that's nearly as hard to shake".

Abby Johnston for The Austin Chronicle thought the track "refuses to tire, propelled forward by a sparkling Seventies guitar riff and Williams' falsetto". Aaron Payne of musicOMH called the track a "real dancefloor filler" and said it has the "groove that Daft Punk are searching for elsewhere on the record, but that's because of Nile Rodgers' guitar; the man is a human groove. Pharrell supplies stylish, modern hooks to go over Rodgers' guitar, and Daft Punk's production and beats add the remaining crucial elements." Eric Henderson of Slant Magazine said the song is a "model of reservation next to the likes of 'Aerodynamic' or even 'Technologic'". Dan Weiss of Paste criticized the song, saying that it "is no miracle; it's not brought off by Pharrell's uncomplicated voice or Nile Rodgers' studied grooves". Robin Murray for Clash opined the song was "such a safe bet – and it feels it" and that "from the crisp, pared down Nile Rodgers guitar to the bubbling synths, it feels ready-made, arriving with a nagging sense that you've heard it some place before".

Accolades
"Get Lucky" was nominated for Best Song of the Summer at the 2013 MTV Video Music Awards. and Best Song at the 2013 MTV Europe Music Awards. The song was nominated for Top Streaming Song (Audio) and Top Dance/Electronic Song at the 2014 Billboard Music Awards. It was also nominated for Choice Music Single: Group and Choice Summer Song at the 2013 Teen Choice Awards. It was ranked by Rolling Stone and The Guardian as the best track of 2013.

On 26 January 2014, "Get Lucky" reached number three in Triple J's Hottest 100 of 2013. The Village Voices Pazz & Jop annual critics' poll ranked "Get Lucky" at number one to find the best music of 2013. It won Best Foreign Song at both the 2013 Sweden Gaffa Awards and Denmark Gaffa Awards. The song received awards for both Best Pop Duo/Group Performance and Record of the Year at the 56th Annual Grammy Awards. The song won Song of the Year at the 2014 BMI London Awards. In 2021, it was listed at No. 465 on Rolling Stone's "Top 500 Best Songs of All Time".

Commercial performance
In France, "Get Lucky" debuted at number one on the French Singles Chart on 27 April 2013, and became Daft Punk's first chart-topping single in their home country since "One More Time" in 2000. The song sold 38,887 copies in three days, making "Get Lucky" the best-selling digital single in a one-week period. It stayed on the chart for a total of 62 weeks. The Syndicat National de l'Édition Phonographique (SNEP) certified it diamond. In the United Kingdom, "Get Lucky" debuted at number three on the UK Singles Chart on 21 April 2013, sold more than 50,000 copies 48 hours after its release and became Daft Punk's first top-10 hit in the United Kingdom since "One More Time" in 2000. The song then peaked at number one the following week, sold over 155,000 copies, and became Daft Punk's first and only number one single in the UK. The song remained in the top position during the following week and sold over 163,000. "Get Lucky" remained at the top of the chart for another three consecutive weeks, selling over 100,000 copies weekly. By late May 2013, over 600,000 copies of the song were sold in four weeks, and sales had exceeded those of Macklemore and Ryan Lewis's "Thrift Shop", which made "Get Lucky" the country's best-selling single of the year thus far. According to the Official Charts Company, the single became Britain's second best-selling single of 2013 with sales of 1,308,007 copies.

In the United States, the song debuted at number 19 on the US Billboard Hot 100 on 24 April 2013, selling 113,000 downloads, which gave Daft Punk their first top 40 hit on the chart. On 22 May 2013, the song rose from number 15 to number 10, and became Daft Punk's first top-10 hit in the US. A few weeks later, "Get Lucky" peaked at number two for five consecutive weeks, and was runner-up to Robin Thicke's "Blurred Lines", which also features Williams. At the time, Williams was the first artist in four years to have songs peak at both number one and two simultaneously on the Hot 100. Chris Molanphy of Slate claimed that the single did not reach number one because "Blurred Lines" had digital sales, radio, online streaming and video. The song debuted at number five on the Billboard Dance/Electronic Songs chart for the week ending 4 May 2013. By the week of 1 June, the song rose to number one, "Get Lucky" also reached the number one position on the Hot Dance Club Songs chart, the first Daft Punk song to do so since "Face to Face" in 2004. , the song has sold over 3,475,000 copies in the US.

The song broke records with the highest number of plays of any song in a single day on Spotify. "Get Lucky" peaked at number one on singles charts of Australia, Austria, both the Belgium Flanders and Wallonia charts, Denmark, Finland, Germany, Hungary, Ireland, Israel, Italy,  Norway, Scotland, Slovakia, Slovenia, South Africa,  Spain, Sweden, and Switzerland.

Live performances
Upon its official release, Williams performed "Get Lucky" live for the first time at an HTC One launch party in Brooklyn. Daft Punk were scheduled to appear on 6 August episode of The Colbert Report to promote Random Access Memories, but were unable to do so because of contractual obligations regarding their scheduled appearance at the 2013 MTV Video Music Awards. According to Stephen Colbert, Daft Punk were unaware of any exclusivity agreement and were stopped by MTV executives the morning before taping. Colbert nevertheless performed a pre-recorded elaborate dance number to "Get Lucky" featuring appearances from Hugh Laurie, Jeff Bridges, Jimmy Fallon, The Rockettes, Bryan Cranston, Jon Stewart, Matt Damon, Charlie Rose and Henry Kissinger. On 26 January 2014, American singer Stevie Wonder joined Rodgers, Williams and Daft Punk onstage to perform the song during the 56th Annual Grammy Awards. In June 2017, Williams performed the song with American-British singer Marcus Mumford at Ariana Grande's One Love Manchester benefit concert.

Formats and track listings

Credits and personnel
Credits adapted from Random Access Memories liner notes.

 Daft Punk – production, vocals, synthesizer
 Pharrell Williams – vocals
 Nile Rodgers – guitar
 Paul Jackson, Jr. – guitar
 Chris Caswell – keyboards
 Nathan East – bass
 Omar Hakim – drums

Charts

Weekly charts

Year-end charts

Decade-end charts

All-time charts

Certifications and sales

See also
 List of best-selling singles in Australia
 List of number-one dance singles of 2013 (U.S.)
 List of number-one singles of 2013 (South Africa)

References

2013 singles
2012 songs
Daft Punk songs
Alisa Kozhikina songs
Columbia Records singles
Disco songs
Funk songs
Grammy Award for Record of the Year
Grammy Award for Best Pop Duo/Group Performance
Music videos directed by Warren Fu
Nile Rodgers songs
Number-one singles in Australia
Number-one singles in Denmark
Number-one singles in Germany
Number-one singles in Greece
Number-one singles in Hungary
Number-one singles in Israel
Number-one singles in Norway
Number-one singles in Russia
Number-one singles in Scotland
Irish Singles Chart number-one singles
Pharrell Williams songs
Record Report Pop Rock General number-one singles
SNEP Top Singles number-one singles
Songs written by Nile Rodgers
Songs written by Guy-Manuel de Homem-Christo
Songs written by Pharrell Williams
Songs written by Thomas Bangalter
South African Airplay Chart number-one singles
Universal Music Group singles
UK Singles Chart number-one singles